Choreographed Man of War is a collaboration album by American indie rock musicians Robert Pollard, Greg Demos, and Jim Macpherson, all members of Guided by Voices. The album features Pollard (vocals, guitar), Demos (bass), and Macpherson (drums) under the name Robert Pollard and his Soft Rock Renegades, a line from the song "A Big Fan Of The Pigpen" from the album Bee Thousand. It is the only album by the trio released under this name.

Track listing
"I Drove a Tank"   – 2:53  
"She Saw the Shadow"   – 2:11  
"Edison's Memos"   – 4:39  
"7th Level Shutdown"   – 3:19  
"40 Yards to the Burning Bush"   – 2:08  
"Aerial"   – 3:15  
"Citizen Fighter"   – 2:24  
"Kickboxer Lightning"   – 3:35  
"Bally Hoo"   – 3:29  
"Instrument Beetle"   – 7:02

Personnel

Musicians 

 Robert Pollard – vocals, guitar
 Greg Demos – bass guitar, lead guitar
 Jim Macpherson – drums

Technical 

 John Shough – engineering
 Mark Greenwald – photography
 Ed Kinsella – photography
 Nick Kizirnis – layout
 Robert Pollard – cover artwork

References

2001 albums
Robert Pollard albums